Benjamin Besa (born June 12, 1989) is a Filipino actor.

Personal life
He was born to a Spanish father and a Filipina mother. He appeared in TV series of GMA Network since 2002 as being grouped with Andrew Schimmer, Jay Aquitania, and Kiel Rodriguez. He chose to finish his studies in 2005 after his contract with GMA Network was finished. When he graduated, he was introduced as part of Star Circle Batch 15 of ABS-CBN. When he played good roles before, he expects to play villain roles hopefully work with his idols John Lloyd Cruz and Aga Muhlach.

References

External links 
 

1989 births
Filipino male television actors
Filipino people of Spanish descent
Living people
Star Magic